Sigma Capricorni, Latinized from σ Capricorni, is a solitary star in the southern constellation of Capricornus, 0.5 degree north of the ecliptic. It is visible to the naked eye as a dim, orange-hued star with an apparent visual magnitude of +5.31. The star is about 1,070 light years away from the Sun based on parallax, but is drifting closer with a radial velocity of −9.6 km/s.

This object is an evolved, K-type giant star with a stellar classification of K2 III. Having exhausted the supply of hydrogen at its core, it has expanded and now has around 67.5 times the girth of the Sun. The star is about 60.5 million years old with 6.3 times the mass of the Sun. It is radiating 1,392 times the luminosity of the Sun from its swollen photosphere at an effective temperature of 4,292 K.

A magnitude 9.43 visual companion is at an angular separation of  along a position angle of 179°, as of 2016.

References

K-type giants

Capricorni, Sigma
Capricornus (constellation)
Durchmusterung objects
Capricorni, 07
193150
100195
7761